Bourride (bourrido, in provençal, borrida, in occitan) is a culinary specialty traditional to cuisine of Provence and Languedoc, based on fish, seafood, and vegetables, served with aïoli and olive oil. A variant of bouillabaisse or fish soup à la Sétoise, this fish soup, originally from Provence and Languedoc, is particularly popular in Toulon (Var) and Agde (Hérault).

The word bourride comes from provençal bourrido (borrida in classical norm of occitan language), which was derived from bouri/bouli (borit/bolit), bouilli (boiled) in French.

Ingredients 
This recipe is prepared with white fish or Mediterranean seafood, such as mullet, mackerel, sea bass, whiting, conger eel, sea robin, sea bream, cod, turbot, le poisson de St Pierre, or monkfish (for bourride à la Sétoise), a brunoise of vegetables (celery, fennel, leeks, carrots, onions, bouquet garni, possibly with white wine), and aïoli. 

Depending on the recipe variations, the fish and the brunoise are cooked independently, or together like a fish stew in court bouillon. At the end of cooking, the fish stock is bound with aïoli and olive oil. Like with bouillabaisse, depending on tastes and local customs and traditions, the fish is served differently: as a garnish along aïoli, with rice, potatoes, or ratatouille, topped with the brunoise sauce. aïoli, or in fish soup. Everything is traditionally served with garlic croutons.

Variants 
 A variant of bourride à la sétoise is traditionally prepared with a monkfish.

References 

French soups
French stews
Occitan cuisine
Cuisine of Provence